Seminarium Lapponicum was an educational institution established in Trondheim, Norway.

The mission of the school was to educate teachers and missionaries to teach Samis using their own Sami language. Seminarium Lapponicum was established in Trondheim by   priest and missionary, Thomas von Westen in 1717. The school closed after Westen died in 1727. The seminar was re-established as the Seminarium lapponicum Fridericianumat at the Trondheim Cathedral School in 1752. It operated until it closed again in 1774 following the death of    linguist and language researcher Knud Leem.

References

Primary Source
Grankvist, Rolf (2003) Seminarium Lapponicum Fredericianum i Trondheims-miljoet (Trondheim: DKNVS) 

1752 establishments in Norway
Educational institutions established in 1717
Educational institutions established in 1752
Sámi history
Education in Trondheim
Schools in Norway